Plymouth is a city in Devon, England.

Plymouth may also refer to:

 Plymouth Colony, founded in North America by English Puritan separatists in 1620
 Plymouth, Massachusetts, known as "America's Hometown," the town now on the site of Plymouth Colony
 Plymouth (automobile), an American automobile brand of Chrysler
 Plymouth cars, see List of Plymouth vehicles

Places

Canada
 Plymouth, Pictou County, Nova Scotia
 Plymouth, Yarmouth County, Nova Scotia

Trinidad and Tobago
 Plymouth, Trinidad and Tobago

United Kingdom
 Plymouth, Merthyr Tydfil, an electoral ward in Wales
 Plymouth (Penarth electoral ward), in Penarth, Wales
 Plymouth, Montserrat, abandoned city in the British Overseas Territory of Montserrat

United States
 Plymouth, California
 Plymouth Colony, founded in North America by the Pilgrim Fathers in 1620
 Plymouth, Connecticut
 Plymouth, Florida
 Plymouth, Illinois
 Plymouth, Indiana
 Plymouth County, Iowa
 Plymouth, Iowa
 Plymouth, Kansas
 Plymouth, Maine
 Plymouth, Massachusetts, known as "America's Hometown", the New England town now on the site of Plymouth Colony
 Plymouth Center, Massachusetts, the main village within the town of Plymouth
 Plymouth Rock, United States historic place within the town of Plymouth
 Plymouth County, Massachusetts
 Plymouth, Michigan
 Plymouth, Minnesota
 Plymouth, Mississippi
 Plymouth, Missouri
 Plymouth, Nebraska
 Plymouth, New Hampshire, a New England town
 Plymouth (CDP), New Hampshire, the main village in the town
 Plymouth, New York
 Plymouth, North Carolina
 Plymouth, Ohio
 Plymouth, Pennsylvania

 Plymouth Township, Montgomery County, Pennsylvania
Plymouth Meeting
 Plymouth, Utah
 Plymouth, Vermont
 Plymouth, West Virginia
 Plymouth, Juneau County, Wisconsin, a town
 Plymouth, Rock County, Wisconsin, a town
 Plymouth, Sheboygan County, Wisconsin, a town
 Plymouth, Wisconsin, a city in Sheboygan County, located within the town of Plymouth
 Plymouth Township (disambiguation)

Business and organisations
 Plymouth Albion R.F.C., English rugby union club based in Plymouth
 Plymouth Argyle F.C., English football club based in Plymouth
 Plymouth Company, an English joint-stock company founded by King James I in 1606 to establish coastal settlements on North America
 Plymouth State University, Plymouth, New Hampshire, part of the University of New Hampshire
 Plymouth University, Devon

Transport
 Plymouth (automobile), an American automobile brand of Chrysler
 Plymouth cars, see List of Plymouth vehicles
 Plymouth Locomotive Works
 Plymouth City Airport, a former airport in Plymouth, England
 HMS Plymouth, any of nine ships bearing this name
 USS Plymouth, any of four ships bearing this name
 Plymouth (MBTA station) in Plymouth, Massachusetts

Other uses
 Plymouth Gin, a brand of gin produced in Plymouth
 Plymouth (software), a graphical boot splash for Linux
 The Plymouth, building listed on the National Register of Historic Places in Washington, D. C.
 Plymouth (film), 1991 pilot for a television series about a mining town on the Moon

See also
 New Plymouth (disambiguation)